Elections to the Massachusetts Senate were held during 1788 to elect 40 State Senators. Candidates were elected at the county level, with some counties electing multiple Senators.

For election, a candidate needed the support of a majority of those voting. If a seat remained vacant because no candidate received such majority, the Massachusetts General Court was empowered to fill it by a majority vote of its members.

Apportionment 
The apportionment of seats by population was as follows:

 Barnstable County: 1
 Berkshire County: 2
 Bristol County: 3
 Cumberland County: 1
 Dukes and Nantucket Counties: 1
 Essex County: 6
 Hampshire County: 4
 Lincoln County: 1
 Middlesex County: 5
 Plymouth County: 3
 Suffolk County: 6
 Worcester County: 5
 York County: 2

Results

Barnstable 

 

Exact totals for Smith, the incumbent Senator, are unknown.

Berkshire 

 

William Williams, Ebenezer Pierce, John Bacon, and William Walker also received votes, though exact totals are unknown.

Dwight was subsequently elected by the General Court.

Bristol 

 
 

Thomas Durfee, Walter Spooner, and Elisha May also received votes, but their exact totals are unknown.

Cumberland

Dukes and Nantucket

Essex 

 
 
 
 
 
 
 
 
 
 
 
 
 

Exact totals for the Anti-Federalist ticket were not listed.

Unaffiliated candidates Peter Coffin and John Choate also received votes, but their exact totals are unknown.

Jonathan Greenleaf was subsequently be elected by the General Court.

Hampshire 

 
 
 
 
 
 

Incumbent Senator David Smead was not re-elected, and his exact vote total is unknown.

Many other candidates received votes throughout the county, but their exact totals are unknown:

Bliss and Sexton were subsequently elected by the General Court.

Lincoln 

 

Waterman Thomas, Daniel Cony, and Henry Dearborn also received votes, but their exact totals are unknown.

Since no candidate received a majority of votes cast, the General Court elected Dummer Sewall to the seat.

Middlesex 

 
 
 
 
 
 
 
 
 
 

Exact totals for Anti-Federalist ticket are not listed.

Nathaniel Gorham, William Hunt, John Brooks (Federalist), William Hull, Joseph Curtis, James Winthrop and Elbridge Gerry also received votes, though their exact totals are unknown.

Plymouth 

 
 
 

Isaac Winslow, Hugh Orr, Joseph Bryant, James Briggs, and Ebenezer White also received votes.

Suffolk 

 
 
 
 
 
 
 

Many other candidates received votes throughout the county, but their exact totals are unknown:

Worcester 

 
 
 
 
 
 
 

Many other candidates received votes throughout the county, but their exact totals are unknown:

York 

 
 
 
 
 

Nathaniel Low also received votes, but his exact total is unknown.

No candidate received a majority. Edward Cutts and Nathaniel Wells were subsequently elected by the General Court.

See also
 List of former districts of the Massachusetts Senate

References 

Senate 1788
Massachusetts
1788 Massachusetts elections
Massachusetts Senate